Eurymedon  of Myrrhinus  married Plato's sister, Potone. He was potentially the grandson of the elder Eurymedon.

Notes

References

5th-century BC Greek people
Ancient Athenians
Family of Plato